Central Hudson may refer to:
Central Hudson Gas & Electric Corp. v. Public Service Commission, a 1980 US Supreme Court case
Central Hudson Energy Group, parent company of Central Hudson Gas & Electric, commonly known as Central Hudson
The Mid-Hudson region of the Hudson Valley
The central portion of the Hudson River